Tržec is a settlement at the confluence of the Polskava River with the Dravinja in the Municipality of Videm in eastern Slovenia. The area traditionally belonged to the Styria region. It is now included in the Drava Statistical Region.

There is a small rectangular chapel-shrine with a polygonal apse in the settlement. It was built in 1922.

References

External links
Tržec on Geopedia

Populated places in the Municipality of Videm